This is a list of the films produced by the Ollywood film industry based in Bhubaneshwar and Cuttack in 1960:

A-Z

References

1960
Ollywood
Films, Ollywood
1960s in Orissa